Cirencester Deer Park School is a secondary school with academy status in Cirencester, Gloucestershire, England. It is situated at the top of Tetbury Hill, an area which had been the site of a World War II American Army Hospital, in Cirencester Park.

History
Founded in 1966, the school combined Cirencester Grammar School with the town's secondary modern school. In 1991 the sixth form was separated into an independent college, Cirencester College, which now shares the same campus as the school. New buildings were built to replace those it had lost to the college.

It became a Technology College in 1995, and a beacon school in 1999. It was converted to an academy in April 2011.

In 2017, the school achieved a "Good" Ofsted report.

In 2020 there were 920 pupils on roll at the school.

Notable former pupils
  Charlie Cooper, actor and writer of BBC Three series This Country
  Daisy May Cooper, actor and writer of BBC Three series This Country
Jake Lee, professional footballer (Cheltenham Town F.C., Weston-super-Mare A.F.C.)
Josh Record, singer/songwriter
Pete Reed, double Olympic Gold Medalist in Rowing (2008, 2012)
Phoebe Paterson Pine, Paralympics Gold Medalist in Archery (2020)

Former headteachers
1997–2003 – Sir David Carter 
1991–1997 – David Crossley 
2003–2022 – Chiquita Henson
2022–present – Richard Clutterbuck

References

External links
 Cirencester Deer Park School

Cirencester
Secondary schools in Gloucestershire
Academies in Gloucestershire
Educational institutions established in 1966